Joint Support Enabling Command (JSEC) is a joint operational level command under the NATO Military Command Structure. The command is designed to facilitate the rapid movement of forces across national borders in Europe. According to NATO spokesperson Oana Lungescu, "The new command in Ulm will help our forces become more mobile and enable rapid reinforcement within the Alliance, ensuring we have the right forces in the right place at the right time". It is under the operational command of Supreme Allied Commander Europe (SACEUR).

The command is staffed by 160 personnel and extendable to 600 if required. It is located in Ulm, Germany. Another article states it will have around 280 personnel in peacetime and more if a crisis develops. It is commanded by Lieutenant General Jürgen Knappe, who is also jointly Commander Multinational Joint Headquarters Ulm. The command was declared  initial operational capable on 20 September 2019.

Background 

The JSEC was announced at the same time as Joint Force Command Norfolk, established to help protect maritime transport and sea lines of communication between North America and Europe; Its design is modeled after a Bundeswehr Joint Support Service Command.

The command was designed in light of growing hostilities between European countries and Russia since the annexation of Crimea in 2014 and in response to logistic and bureaucratic hurdles limiting military logistics in case of a crisis. A research paper by the German Federal Academy for Security Policy mentions specific logistical issue such as modernizing diplomatic clearances required for troop movement, loading capacity standards for trucks, ascertaining which roads, tunnels and bridges in Europe can withstand tank and other heavy vehicle's movement. The German Federal Academy for Security Policy's view is that the forming of JSEC is a possible driver for the establishment of a "Military Schengen".

See also
Military Mobility

References

External links 

 Joint Support and Enabling Command

Formations of the NATO Military Command Structure
Formations of the NATO Military Command Structure 1994–present
Military units and formations established in 2019